Christian Loic Koffi (born 28 August 2000) is a French footballer. He plays for Spanish club Intercity.

Career
In 2018, Koffi signed for Italian Serie A side Fiorentina after rejecting an offer from Liverpool, one of the most successful teams in England.

On 1 February 2021, he joined Serie C club Como on loan until the end of the 2020–21 season.

On 18 August 2022, Koffi moved to Intercity in Spain.

References

External links

2000 births
Living people
French footballers
French sportspeople of Ivorian descent
Association football wingers
Association football midfielders
ACF Fiorentina players
Cesena F.C. players
Como 1907 players
FC Sète 34 players
CF Intercity players
Serie C players
Championnat National players
French expatriate footballers
Expatriate footballers in Italy
French expatriate sportspeople in Italy
Expatriate footballers in Spain
French expatriate sportspeople in Spain